The Evangelisch-reformierte Kirche Basel-Stadt (literally: Evangelical-Reformed Church of the Canton Basel-Stadt) is a Reformed denomination in the canton of Basel-Stadt. In 2004 it had 51,000 members in six German parishes with 3 German speaking congregations, one Italian, one French Reformed congregation and 49 ordained clergy. Member of the Schweizerischer Evangelischer Kirchenbund and the Conference of Churches on the Rhine.

The church was established by Johannes Oekolampad in 1529. For 400 years was the state church in Basel.
Women ordination is allowed.

References

Further reading
  (German)
  (German)
 J. J. Herzog, Leben Joh. Oecolampads und die Reformation der Kirche in Basel (1843) (German)
 K. R. Hagenbach, Johann Oecolampad und Oswald  Myconius, die Reformatoren Basels (1859) (German)

External links
Evangelisch-reformierte Kirche Basel-Stadt 

Basel Stadt
Basel Stadt
Basel-Stadt